Stavanger Rugby Klubb is a Norwegian rugby & league club based in Stavanger, Norway. They currently compete in the Norwegian Rugby Championship 15´s & 7´s.

History
The club was founded in 1978. Currently the club has 3 junior teams, U10, U14 and U18 after the recent addition of the Berserkers group to SRK, a women's senior team and a men's senior team. The club has been especially successful in the last ten years, winning numerous national competitions, an international competition and supplying several players to the Norwegian national team, such as Kristoffer Borsheim (the player with the most matches played in the history of the Norwegian national rugby team), Benjamin Brøndmo or Nikola Saeby. Also the women's team has contributed regularly to the women´s national team with players like Ingrid Ringrud (current SRK women's captain), Gunvor Romsbotn or Linn Terese Kolnes.
Since 2011 the club trains during the season on Lassa, a natural grass field. However, during the winter and due to the Norwegian weather, the club has trained at Hinna park (astroturf field) close to the Viking FK training facilities. 

The club has been recently very successful in 7-a-side, winning National championships in Senior men and U18 Juniors.

 2009 Norge 7´s champions
 2010 Norge 7´s champions
 2011 Norge 7´s champions
 2014 Norge 7's champions
 2014 Norge 15's champions
 2015 Norge 7's champions
 2015 Norge 15's champions
 2015 Copenhagen 7´s Plate trophy champions
 2016 Norge 7's champions
 2016 Norge 15's Champions
 2016 Norge U18 7's Champions
 2017 Norge 7s Champions
 2017 Norge U18 Champions
 2017 Norge rugby league Champions 
 2017 Oslo 9s rugby league Champions
 2017 Lister league 7s Champions
 2018 Norge 7´s Champions
 2018 Norge rugby league champions
 2019 Norge rugby league champions
 2021 Norge rugby league champions

References

External links
https://www.aftenbladet.no/sport/i/21R7oG/stavanger-rugbyklubb-tok-sitt-femte-nm-gull-paa-rad

Norwegian rugby union teams
Sport in Stavanger
Rugby clubs established in 1978
1978 establishments in Norway
Rugby league in Norway
Euro XIII
Rugby league teams